Barmston is a village and civil parish in the East Riding of Yorkshire, England. It is situated on the Holderness coast, overlooking the North Sea and to the east of the A165 road. The parish includes the village of Fraisthorpe, the former villages of Auburn and Hartburn have been abandoned due to coastal erosion. Barmston is mentioned in the Domesday Book as having eight ploughlands and belonging to Drogo of la Beuvrière. The name of the village derives from Beorn's Tūn (Beorn's Town). According to the 2011 UK census, Barmston and Fraisthorpe parish had a population of 275, a slight decrease on the 2001 UK census figure of 277.

The beach at Barmston was awarded the Blue flag rural beach award in 2005, but was removed from the list of designated bathing beaches in 2010, as a result of erosion making access to the beach difficult.

The parish church of All Saints is a Grade I listed building. Barmston public house is the Black Bull. The Old Hall was designated a Grade II* listed building in 1952 and is now recorded in the National Heritage List for England, maintained by Historic England.

A key industry in the village is tourism and there is a caravan park located on former agricultural land near the beach. The cliffs are made of soft marl clay and are subject to erosion. Numerous properties have been demolished over the years to prevent them from falling into the sea. The position of a road leading down to the beach (long since lost to the sea) is clearly visible. The road still exists to the clifftop, which is blocked off by a barrier, and the rocks that supported the slope are still visible at low tide, giving an indication of how far the cliff has eroded. The coast road was completely lost to the sea by 1996. Barmston is one of the worst locations in England for coastal erosion; in 1967,  of coastline was lost over just two days due to storms in October.

Barmston is the proposed landfall site for a carbon capture and storage scheme linking the proposed Don Valley Power Project at Stainforth, near Hatfield in South Yorkshire and the White Rose CCS project at Drax Power Station in North Yorkshire with porous rock beneath the North Sea.

Geography
The A165 Bridlington Road passes through the parish.

History
The village of Barmston gave its name to the ancient parish and ecclesiastical parishes of Barmston. The parish was bounded by watercourses of Earl's Dike (also known as Watermill Grounds Beck) to the north, and Barmston drain to the south. Although the current civil parish is called "Barmston" its parish council is called "Barmston and Fraisthorpe Parish Council".

The village of Hartburn on the Holderness coast was deserted after the 15th century and no longer exists due to coastal erosion. The village was located just south of the outflow of Earl's Dike on the coastline.

The hamlet of Winkton in the parish of Barmston had also been long abandoned by the 1850s.

The village of Auburn in the former parish of Fraisthorpe was abandoned to coastal erosion, except for a farm; the chapel was dismantled in the 1780s.

Notable people
William Dade, was vicar of the parish of Barmston between 1766 and 1790

References

Maps

Sources

External links

 

Villages in the East Riding of Yorkshire
Populated coastal places in the East Riding of Yorkshire
Civil parishes in the East Riding of Yorkshire